"Smoke & Mirrors" is the fourth episode of the second season of the American television series Agent Carter, inspired by the films Captain America: The First Avenger and Captain America: The Winter Soldier, and the Marvel One-Shot short film also titled Agent Carter. It features the Marvel Comics character Peggy Carter, and juxtaposes her history with that of Whitney Frost. The episode is set in the Marvel Cinematic Universe (MCU), sharing continuity with the films of the franchise. The episode was written by Sue Chung and directed by David Platt.

Hayley Atwell reprises her role as Carter from the film series, and is joined by regular cast members James D'Arcy, Chad Michael Murray, and Enver Gjokaj.

"Smoke & Mirrors" originally aired on ABC on February 2, 2016, and according to Nielsen Media Research, was watched by 2.77 million viewers.

Plot

In the 1920s, in Broxton, Oklahoma, Agnes Cully (who would later become Whitney Frost) is shown to have a brilliant mind, fixing a broken radio, inventing devices, and applying to a science program at the University of Oklahoma (unsuccessfully due to her gender). In 1934, Cully travels to Hollywood, where she is approached by a talent agent, promising to make her a star. In 1940 in England, Peggy Carter, who is engaged, receives an offer to join the Special Operations Executive due to her work at Bletchley Park as a code breaker; she eventually accepts the offer and leaves her fiancé after her brother's death in the war. In 1947, Carter and Edwin Jarvis kidnap Rufus Hunt in an attempt to learn more about the Council. After getting names of members of the Council and locations of transcripts of their meetings, Carter and Sousa prepare the SSR to infiltrate the Arena Club, but are stopped by Vernon Masters. They let a bugged Hunt escape, and he attempts to blackmail Calvin Chadwick in exchange for protection. Displeased with the mess he was causing, Frost absorbs Hunt, revealing her abilities to Chadwick.

Production

Development
In January 2016, Marvel announced that the fourth episode of the season would be titled "Smoke & Mirrors", to be written by Sue Chung, with David Platt directing.

Casting

In January 2016, Marvel revealed that main cast members Hayley Atwell, James D'Arcy, Enver Gjokaj, Wynn Everett, Reggie Austin, and Chad Michael Murray would star as Peggy Carter, Edwin Jarvis, Daniel Sousa, Whitney Frost, Jason Wilkes, and Jack Thompson, respectively. It was also revealed that the guest cast for the episode would include Currie Graham as Calvin Chadwick, Kurtwood Smith as Vernon Masters, Chris Browning as Rufus Hunt, Carole Ruggier as Mrs. Carter, Gabriella Graves as young Peggy Carter, Webb Baker Hayes as young Michael Carter, Ivy George as young Agnes Cully, Olivia Welch as teen Agnes Cully, Samaire Armstrong as Wilma Cully, Chris Mulkey as Uncle Bud, Max Brown as Michael Carter, Christopher Grove as Mr. Edwards, Catriona Toop as Bletchley girl #1, Jennifer Neala Page as Bletchley girl #2, Kevin Changaris as Fred Wells, Jonathan Lavallee as FBI Agent, Andrew Carter as Ned Silver, Khalilah Joi as ticket lady and Tamika Katon-Donegal as Mabel. Ruggier, Graves, Hayes, George, Welch, Toop, Page, Lavallee, Carter, Joi, and Katon-Donegal did not receive guest star credit in the episode, while Everett and Austin received guest star credit instead of regular starring. Graham, Smith, and Browning reprise their roles from earlier in the series.

Release

Broadcast
"Smoke & Mirrors" was first aired in the United States on ABC on February 2, 2016.

Reception

Ratings
In the United States the episode received a 0.8/2 percent share among adults between the ages of 18 and 49, meaning that it was seen by 0.8 percent of all households, and 2 percent of all of those watching television at the time of the broadcast. It was watched by 2.77 million viewers.

References

External links
 "Smoke & Mirrors" at ABC
 

Agent Carter (TV series) episodes
2016 American television episodes